Refractory cytopenia of childhood  is a subgroup of myelodysplastic syndrome (MDS), having been added to the World Health Organization classification in 2008. Before then, RCC cases were classified as childhood aplastic anemia. RCC is the most common form of MDS in children and adolescents, accounting for approximately half of all MDS cases.

Presentation

Symptoms result from underproduction of red blood cells (weakness, pallor, failure to thrive, pica), white blood cells (recurrent or overwhelming infection), and/or platelets (bleeding).

Histopathologic features

The bone marrow of patients with RCC contains islands of erythroid precursors and spare granulocytes.  In some scenarios, multiple bone marrow biopsy examinations may be recommended before a diagnosis can be established.

Diagnosis

Management
Bone marrow transplant is the only known curative treatment.

References

Myeloid neoplasia